Oô is a commune in the Haute-Garonne department in the Occitanie region in southwestern France. It borders Spain on its southern side.

Population

Its inhabitants are called Ousiens.

Geography
The Lac d'Oô is situated in the commune.

See also
Communes of the Haute-Garonne department

References

External links

 Official site 

Communes of Haute-Garonne